Thomas Martin ( 1679–1765), of Cheshunt, Hertfordshire and Clapham, Surrey  was a British banker and Whig politician who sat in the House of Commons from 1727 to 1734.

Martin was the eldest son of William Martin of Evesham, Worcestershire. He joined the banking firm of Smith and Stone, at the sign of ‘the Grasshopper’, in Lombard Street, London before 1699. In 1703, he became a partner  and in 1711 sole partner of what became Martins Bank. He married Elizabeth Lowe, daughter of Richard Lowe of Cheshunt.

At the 1727 British general election Martin was returned as Whig Member of Parliament   for Wilton. He voted with the Administration in all recorded divisions. He did not stand at the 1734 British general election.

Martin died without issue on  21 April 1765.

References

1670s births
1765 deaths
Members of the Parliament of Great Britain for English constituencies
British MPs 1727–1734